Clarence von Rosen Jr. (November 10, 1903 – July 7, 1933) was a Swedish horse rider who competed in the 1932 Summer Olympics. In 1932 he and his horse Sunnyside Maid won the bronze medal in the individual eventing.

At the same Olympics he also won the bronze medal in the individual jumping competition with his horse Empire. In both events the Swedish team was not able to complete the competition with three riders, therefore he was unable to win team medals.

He was the son of Clarence von Rosen. Rosen died in a plane crash in 1933 while the passenger of an aircraft during an airshow.

References

External links 
 profile

1903 births
1933 deaths
Swedish event riders
Swedish show jumping riders
Olympic equestrians of Sweden
Swedish male equestrians
Equestrians at the 1932 Summer Olympics
Olympic bronze medalists for Sweden
Olympic medalists in equestrian
Medalists at the 1932 Summer Olympics
Victims of aviation accidents or incidents in 1933
Victims of aviation accidents or incidents in Sweden